The 1974 Championship of Australia was the 18th edition of the Championship of Australia, an ANFC-organised national club Australian rules football tournament between the champion clubs from the VFL, the SANFL, the WANFL and a Tasmanian League side that contain players drawn from the premier clubs of the NTFA, NWFU and TANFL.

Qualified Teams

Venue

Fixtures

Semi-finals

Third-place play-off

Championship of Australia final 

Championship of Australia
Australian rules football competitions in Australia
1974 in Australian rules football
October 1974 sports events in Australia